William Robert Janis (born October 15, 1962) is an American politician of the Republican Party. From 2002 to 2012, he was a member of the Virginia House of Delegates. He represented the 56th district west of Richmond, including Goochland and Louisa counties and part of Henrico County.

Notes

References

 (Constituent/campaign website)

External links

1962 births
Living people
Republican Party members of the Virginia House of Delegates
Virginia lawyers
Virginia Military Institute alumni
University of Virginia School of Law alumni
People from Henrico County, Virginia
21st-century American politicians